Jacob Lee-Nicholas Sullenger (born December 23, 1995), known professionally by his stage name Jawny (stylized in all caps; formerly Johnny Utah), is an American singer, songwriter, and producer. He first received recognition after the release of his 2019 single "Honeypie", and was signed to Interscope Records in January 2020. He made his major-label debut with the mixtape For Abby in late October 2020.

Early life and education

Jacob Sullenger was born and raised in the San Francisco Bay Area. He first learned how to play guitar at the age of 6 and began composing songs in his early teens. He briefly attended college where he studied nursing, but dropped out to pursue music. He also managed a pizzeria in New Jersey to pay bills.

Career

At the age of 20 in 2016, Sullenger moved to Philadelphia where he began making music under the moniker Johnny Utah. The pseudonym was a reference to Keanu Reeves' character in the 1991 film Point Break.

In January 2018, he released a self-titled EP via Z Tapes Records. He released several more singles that year, including "Folding Like Honey", "PATTY", and "Crazy For Your Love". His songs also appeared on the Spotify "Bedroom Pop" playlist. In November 2018, the tracks were compiled by Z Tapes Records into a second EP entitled Big Dogs. Another song from that EP, "Really Meant", appeared in a 2019 episode of the HBO series High Maintenance.

In April 2019, he released the single "Honeypie", which was later featured on the Spotify playlists, "Fresh Finds" and "Ultimate Indie". That exposure led to the song accruing millions of streams on the platform.

Sullenger was signed to Interscope Records in January 2020 and changed his stage name to Jawny around that time. He also relocated to Los Angeles.

In February 2020, he released the single "Anything You Want". He released his Interscope debut project, For Abby, in October 2020. Jawny described the 10-track project as a mixtape rather than an EP. One of the collection's singles, "Sabotage," premiered at number 34 on the Billboard Alternative Airplay chart in January 2021.

Personal life
Sullenger was in a romantic relationship with rapper and singer-songwriter Doja Cat from August 2019 to February 2020.

Discography

Mixtapes

EPs

Singles

References

External links
Official website

Living people
Interscope Records artists
Singers from Pennsylvania
Singers from California
Record producers from Los Angeles
Record producers from Pennsylvania
Songwriters from California
Songwriters from Pennsylvania
American indie rock musicians
Musicians from Philadelphia
21st-century American singers
1995 births